Carl Everett Sawyer (October 19, 1890 – January 17, 1957) was an infielder in Major League Baseball. Nicknamed "Huck", he played for the Washington Senators.

References

External links

1890 births
1957 deaths
Major League Baseball infielders
Washington Senators (1901–1960) players
Baseball players from Seattle
Los Angeles Angels (minor league) players
Des Moines Boosters players
Minneapolis Millers (baseball) players
Vernon Tigers players